The Fosters Professional was the final name of a series of snooker tournaments which ran for five editions from 1984 to 1988. From 1984 to 1986 it was known as the Carlsberg Challenge and in 1987 was called the Carling Challenge. Mike Hallett was the final champion of the series, all of which were held at RTÉ Studios in Dublin, Ireland.

Winners

References

Fosters Professional
Snooker non-ranking competitions
Recurring sporting events established in 1984
Recurring events disestablished in 1988
Defunct snooker competitions